() is a mixture of dried herbs considered typical of the Provence region of southeastern France. Formerly simply a descriptive term, commercial blends started to be sold under this name in the 1970s. These blends often contain savory, marjoram, rosemary, thyme, and oregano. Lavender leaves are also sometimes included, especially in North American formulations. The herb mixture is typically used with grilled foods and stews.

History

Provençal cuisine has traditionally used many herbs which were often characterized collectively as herbes de Provence, but not in specific combinations, and not sold as a mixture. It was in the 1970s that homogenised mixtures were formulated by spice wholesalers, including notably Ducros in France (now part of McCormick & Company).

Origin 
The commercial name herbes de Provence has no Protected Geographical Status or other legal definition. Indeed, only 10% of herbes de Provence sold in France are produced in France; 95% come from Central and Eastern European countries (notably Poland and Albania), the Maghreb, or China. Herbes de Provence are often sold in larger bags than other herbs, and the price in Provence is considerably lower than for other herbs.

Herbs used
These mixtures typically contain savory, marjoram, rosemary, thyme, oregano, and other herbs. In the North American market, lavender leaves are also typically included, though lavender does not appear in the recipes in Jean-Baptiste Reboul's 1910 compendium of Provençal cooking. The Label Rouge definition is 19% thyme, 27% rosemary, 27% savory, and 27% oregano.

Uses
Herbes de Provence are used to flavour grilled foods such as fish and meat, as well as vegetable stews. The mixture can be added to foods before, during, or after cooking or mixed with cooking oil prior to cooking so as to infuse the flavour into the cooked food. They can also be sprinkled on raw foods such as vinaigrettes, salads or fresh cheese.

See also
 List of herbs
 Fines herbes

References 

Herbs
Herb and spice mixtures
Cuisine of Provence
French cuisine